Michael Delonte Reed (born January 12, 1993) is an American professional boxer.

Amateur career
Reed won the 2005 National Silver Gloves Championship, the 2009 U.S. Junior National Championship, and the 2011 National Golden Gloves Championship. He finished second at the 2010 U.S. National Championships, third at the 2010 National PAL Championships, and fourth at the 2011 U.S. National Championships. He was named the 2011 Amateur Boxer of the Year by boxing website Stiff Jab. Reed finished his amateur career with a record of 90–13.

Professional career
Reed made his professional debut on March 2, 2013, scoring a first-round technical knockout (TKO) victory over Kareem McFarland at the Rosecroft Raceway in Fort Washington, Maryland. He secured five more victories in 2013; a knockout (KO) over Cassius Clay in April; DeMarcus Rogers by unanimous decision (UD) in June; stoppages over Roberto Lopez in July and Ramesis Gil in September; and a UD against Randy Fuentes in October.

He fought four times in the first half of 2014, scoring wins over Jorge Marquez by TKO in January; Bilal Mahasin by UD in March; Regino Canales by corner retirement (RTD) in April; and Alberto Morales by UD in June. A month after his win over Morales, it was announced that Reed had signed a promotional deal with Bob Arum's Top Rank. He finished the year with UD wins against Osnel Charles in October and Oscar Valenzuela in November.

He began 2015 with TKO wins over Edgardo Soto in March and Osenohan Vazquez in May, followed by a UD victory against Luis Joel Gonzalez in June. Reed ended the year with TKO wins over Antonio Canas in September and Rondale Hubbert in November.

He secured four more wins in 2016; Samuel Amoako by UD in March; TKOs over Abraham Cordero in June and Aaron Herrera in October; and a UD against Sidney Siqueira in December.

Following two UD victories in 2017 – against Reyes Sanchez in April and Robert Franckel in August – Reed challenged for his first professional championship, the WBC Continental Americas super lightweight title, against undefeated future unified world champion José Ramírez. The bout took place on November 11, 2017, at the Save Mart Center in Fresno, California. Reed suffered the first defeat of his professional career via second-round KO.

He only fought once in 2018, suffering the second loss of his career to Arnold Barboza Jr. via UD over ten rounds. Reed bounced back in 2019 with two victories; a KO over Yardley Armenta Cruz in April and a UD against Angel Hernandez in June.

Professional boxing record

References

External links

Mike Reed – Top Rank Boxing

1993 births
Living people
Boxers from Maryland
People from Waldorf, Maryland
Boxers from Washington, D.C.
National Golden Gloves champions
Light-welterweight boxers
Southpaw boxers

American male boxers